Ali Salama (born September 18, 1987) is a Libyan footballer, currently playing for Al-Nasr Benghazi in the Libyan Premier League. At 6'1, he plays as a sweeper or centre-back. He is known for his aggressive style of play, and he is regarded as the best defender in Libya and one of the best in Africa. His skills are based on superb reading of the game, precise tackling, and good aerial ability. He captained his national team to glory in the 2014 African Nations Championship.

References

External links
 Ali Salama stats at HTCI.ly 

Libyan footballers
Living people
1987 births
2012 Africa Cup of Nations players
Al-Nasr SC (Benghazi) players
Al-Ahly SC (Benghazi) players
Al-Ahli SC (Tripoli) players
Al-Madina SC players
Association football defenders
Libya international footballers
Libyan Premier League players
Libya A' international footballers
2014 African Nations Championship players
Libyan expatriate footballers
Libyan expatriate sportspeople in Egypt
Libyan expatriate sportspeople in Tunisia
Expatriate footballers in Egypt
Expatriate footballers in Tunisia